Alencheh (also known as Alenjeh, Alīnjeh, Alundzha, Alūnjeh, and Alunjeh) is a village in Aq Bolagh Rural District, Sojas Rud District, Khodabandeh County, Zanjan Province, Iran. At the 2006 census, its population was 371, in 72 families.

References 

Populated places in Khodabandeh County